Enterprise is an unincorporated community located in the town of Enterprise, Oneida County, Wisconsin, United States.

References

Unincorporated communities in Oneida County, Wisconsin
Unincorporated communities in Wisconsin